Isabel Cecilia Plá Jarufe (born 31 January 1964) is a Chilean politician.

References

External links

1964 births
Living people
Chilean people
Chilean people of Catalan descent
Chilean people of Arab descent
Diego Portales University alumni
Alberto Hurtado University alumni
21st-century Chilean politicians
Independent Democratic Union politicians
Ministers of Women and Gender Equality of Chile
Women government ministers of Chile